Whole-process people's democracy, formerly termed whole-process democracy, is a Chinese Communist Party (CCP) political concept describing the people's participation in, and relationship to, governance under socialism with Chinese characteristics.

Development of concept 
The concept of whole-process people's democracy developed in distinct stages.

First, the term "whole-process democracy" was used to describe existing governance practices such as Chinese experiments with democratic elements in the legislative process and in local government activities. CCP general secretary Xi Jinping first used the term publicly on November 2, 2019, while visiting the Shanghai grassroots consultative center for the National People's Congress (NPC). Xi stated, “China’s people’s democracy is a type of whole-process democracy” in which legislation is enacted “after going through procedures and democratic deliberations to ensure that decision-making is sound and democratic."

Second, whole process democracy was incorporated into Chinese law in March 2021. The NPC passed the Decision on Amending the Organic Law of the NPC, which incorporated "adherence to whole process democracy." The NPC is a relatively weak institution, and viewed whole process democracy as an area where it could make significant contributions. As a result the NPC led a national campaign (in which local people's congresses at all levels participated) to promote the principle. The CCP then incorporated the concept into its ideology, promoting it and explaining it as an improved model of socialist democracy suited for the needs of the 21st century.

On July 1, 2021, Xi incorporated the word "people's" into the concept during his speech at the 100th Anniversary of the Chinese Communist Party, and coining the concepts' current name: "whole-process people's democracy." Xi tied the concept to "common prosperity." The addition of "people's" to the concept emphasizes the Maoist practice of the mass line.

Theory 
Xi describes four components of whole-process people's democracy, expressed as paired relationships: 

 Process democracy (过程民主) and achievement democracy (成果民主)
 Procedural democracy (程序民主) and substantive democracy (实质民主)
 Direct democracy (直接民主) and indirect democracy (间接民主)
 People's democracy (人民民主) and the will of the state (国家意志) 

According to Xi, this results in "real and effective socialist democracy."

The concept's emphasis on "whole-process" is intended to further distinguish the CCP approach to democracy from the procedural qualities of liberal democracy. It includes primarily consequentialist criteria for evaluating claims of democracy's success. In this view, the most important criterion is whether democracy can "solve the people's real problems," while a system in which "the people are awakened only for voting" is not truly democratic.

Whole-process people's democracy also serves as a political tool to both defend the Chinese government's governance practices and criticize liberal democracy. In the CCP's view, whole-process people's democracy is “more extensive, more genuine and more effective” than American democracy. The CCP uses the concept of whole-process people's democracy as a means to participate in global discourses on democracy, seeking to deflect criticism and improve its foreign relations. This ties into the government's larger efforts to promote its global leadership. In that regard, the Chinese government's 2021 white paper China: A Democracy that Works emphasizes the whole-process people's democracy perspective in an effort to demonstrate the country's "institutional self-confidence." The white paper argues that whole-process people's democracy is the impetus behind China's development and growth. In another example of the government's promotion of the whole-process people's democracy concept in an effort to increase its "discourse power," then-Ambassador to the United States Qin Gang gave remarks at a conference organized by U.S. thinktanks the Carter Center and The George H.W. Bush Foundation for US-China Relations in which he stated, "Isn't it obvious that both China's people-center philosophy and President Lincoln's 'of the people, by the people, for the people' are for the sake of the people? [...]  Shall we understand China's socialist whole-process democracy as this: from the people, to the people, with the people, for the people?"

See also 

 Ideology of the Chinese Communist Party
 Chinese views on democracy
 Democracy in China

References 

Politics of China
Ideology of the Chinese Communist Party
History of socialism